Abisme /æˈbiːm/ is located in Cassini Regio at . Craters Climborin, Clarin, Dapamort, Johun and Valdebron can be found inside Abisme. It was imaged for the first time by the Cassini spacecraft in 2004.

Nomenclature 
Abisme is named after a Saracen baron in the Old French epic poem Song of Roland; this name was approved by the International Astronomical Union in 2013.

See also 

 List of geological features on Iapetus

External sources 
Map of Iapetus

References 

Impact craters on Saturn's moons
Surface features of Iapetus (moon)